Herwald Ramsbotham, 1st Viscount Soulbury  (6 March 1887 – 30 January 1971) was a British Conservative politician. He served as a government minister between 1931 and 1941 and served as Governor-General of Ceylon between the years 1949 and 1954.

Background
Ramsbotham was the son of Herwald Ramsbotham, of Crowborough Warren (son of James Ramsbotham and Jane Fielden), and Ethel Margaret Bevan.

He went to Uppingham School, Uppingham, Rutland, England.

Military career
Ramsbotham was commissioned a Temporary Lieutenant in 1915 and was promoted to temporary Captain later the same year. He was promoted to temporary Major by 1918 and received the Military Cross. He was appointed an OBE in 1919 and relinquished his commission that year.

Political career
Ramsbotham was elected Member of Parliament (MP) for Lancaster in 1929. In 1931 he was appointed Parliamentary Secretary to the Board of Education by Ramsay MacDonald, a post he retained when Stanley Baldwin became Prime Minister in June 1935, and then served as Parliamentary Secretary to the Ministry of Agriculture and Fisheries between November 1935 and July 1936. In September 1936 he was made Minister of Pensions by Baldwin. He continued in this office when Neville Chamberlain became Prime Minister in May 1937. In June 1939 he was appointed First Commissioner of Works and sworn of the Privy Council.

Ramsbotham entered the cabinet in April 1940 as President of the Board of Education. He remained in this office after Winston Churchill became Prime Minister in May 1940 but was succeeded by R. A. Butler in July 1941. In August he was raised to the peerage as Baron Soulbury, of Soulbury in the County of Buckingham, and made Chairman of the Assistance Board, a post he held until 1948. Chairman of the Soulbury Commission 1944–45. Between 1949 and 1954 he served as Governor-General of Ceylon. He was appointed a GCMG in 1949 and a GCVO on 20 April 1954. On 10 June of that year, he was further honoured when he was created Viscount Soulbury, of Soulbury in the County of Buckingham.

Family
Lord Soulbury died in January 1971 at the age of 83.

He was succeeded in the viscountcy by his elder son James Ramsbotham, 2nd Viscount Soulbury. His younger son, Sir Peter Ramsbotham, notably served as British Ambassador to the United States from 1974 to 1977.

References

External links 

 

1887 births
1971 deaths
British Secretaries of State for Education
Ramsbotham, Herwald
Deputy Lieutenants of Bedfordshire
Governors-general of Ceylon
Knights Grand Cross of the Order of St Michael and St George
Knights Grand Cross of the Royal Victorian Order
Ramsbotham, Herwald, 1st Viscount Soulbury
Members of the Privy Council of the United Kingdom
Ministers in the Chamberlain peacetime government, 1937–1939
Ministers in the Chamberlain wartime government, 1939–1940
Ministers in the Churchill wartime government, 1940–1945
Officers of the Order of the British Empire
Barons created by George VI
Viscounts created by Elizabeth II
People from British Ceylon
Recipients of the Military Cross
Ramsbotham, Herwald
Ramsbotham, Herwald
Ramsbotham, Herwald
UK MPs who were granted peerages
Presidents of the Classical Association